The Haima 7X is a 7-seat multi-purpose vehicle (MPV) produced by Chinese automaker Haima Automobile since 2020.

Overview
The Haima 7X was revealed at Auto Guangzhou in November 2019 as a replacement to the Haima F7 and to help increase sales from the company. It was launched in August 2020 and has a price range of ￥130.000 to ￥150.000 ($18,780–$21,670).

The Haima 7X was showcased at the 2020 Auto Expo in Greater Noida, Uttar Pradesh, India in February, previewing possible future entry of the company and sale of the MPV in the country.

Design
According to Haima, the 7X was designed by Italian company Pininfarina and features a yacht-themed design inspired by Italian luxury yachts. The design of the Haima 7X is based on the 2018 Haima VF00 concept revealed at Auto China in Beijing in April 2018.

Specifications
The Haima 7X is powered by 1.6 liter turbo engine with 190 horsepower and 293Nm of torque with a 6-speed automatic transmission. The 7X is based on the Haima Global Architecture platform (HMGA). The 7X has 7 seats and a 2+2+3 seat configuration.

References

Haima vehicles
Cars introduced in 2020
Minivans